Early mayoral and city council elections were contested in the Ukrainian capital Kyiv on May 25, 2008. The snap election was called by the Ukrainian parliament, the Verkhovna Rada by a 246-5 vote on March 18 amid corruption allegations involving the incumbent Mayor Leonid Chernovetskyi. The local election determined the new Mayor of Kyiv, as well as the composition of the 120-seat Kyiv City Council.

The Ukrainian parliament assigned the job of determining the election costs to the Central Election Commission of Ukraine, working in partnership with the Kyiv City Election Commission. The Kyiv CEC designated March 26 as the date for the start of election campaigning.

In all, seven parties and blocs passed the 3% threshold needed to gain seats in the Kyiv City Council. The incumbent Leonid Chernovetskyi was officially declared the winner of the mayoral election on May 30. Yuriy Lozovskyi, Secretary of the Kyiv CEC, said that the voter turnout was estimated at 53-54%.

The electoral commission said that the elections were largely clear and fair without any major incidents, but that the largest electoral violation was voter shopping.

Although legally the following Kyiv local election had to take place in 2013, eventually elections for the post of Mayor and members of Kyiv City Council took place on 25 May 2014 as part of the 2014 Ukrainian local elections.

Candidates, parties, and blocs

In all, seventy-nine candidates were registered by the Kyiv Territorial Electoral Commission for the upcoming mayoral election. Candidates from some of the main political parties included:
 the incumbent Mayor Leonid Chernovetskyi, from the Christian Liberal Party of Ukraine. He was facing allegations of corruption and illegal privatization of Kyiv territories,
 Vitaliy Klychko, a politician in the Kyiv City Council and former heavyweight boxer,
 Oleh Tyahnybok, from the All-Ukrainian Union "Freedom",
 Vladyslav Kaskyv, from the Civil Party "PORA";
 Vice-Prime Minister Oleksandr Turchynov, from the Yulia Tymoshenko Bloc and the Our Ukraine–People's Self-Defense Bloc;
 Vasyl Horbal, from the Party of Regions;

A total of 37 parties and blocs participated in the Kyiv City Council election. These included both national (e.g. Yulia Tymoshenko Bloc, Our Ukraine) and local political parties (e.g. Leonid Chernovetskyi Bloc).

Results

Mayoral election

|-
| style="background-color:#E9E9E9;text-align:left;vertical-align:top;" |Candidates
! style="background-color:#E9E9E9"|Votes
! style="background-color:#E9E9E9;text-align:center;" |%
! style="background-color:#E9E9E9;text-align:center;" |   2006
|-
| style="text-align:left;" |Leonid Chernovetskyi (Leonid Chernovetskyi Bloc)
| style="vertical-align:top;" |431,500
| style="vertical-align:top;" |37.72%
| style="vertical-align:top;" | 5,89%
|-
| style="text-align:left;" |Oleksandr Turchynov (Yulia Tymoshenko Bloc)
| style="vertical-align:top;" |218,600
| style="vertical-align:top;" |19.13%
| style="vertical-align:top;" |Did not run
|-
| style="text-align:left;" |Vitaliy Klychko (Vitaliy Klychko Bloc)
| style="vertical-align:top;" |205,300
| style="vertical-align:top;" |17.97%
| style="vertical-align:top;" | 5,73%
|-
| style="text-align:left;" |Victor Pylypyshyn (Lytvyn Bloc)
| style="vertical-align:top;" |
| style="vertical-align:top;" |6.73%
| style="vertical-align:top;" |Did not run
|-
| style="text-align:left;" |Mykola Katerynchuk (Mykola Katerynchuk Bloc)
| style="vertical-align:top;" |
| style="vertical-align:top;" |4.43%
| style="vertical-align:top;" |Did not run
|-
| style="text-align:left;" |Vasyl Horbal (Party of Regions)
| style="vertical-align:top;" |
| style="vertical-align:top;" |2.54%
| style="vertical-align:top;" |Did not run
|-
| style="text-align:left;" |Oleksandr Omelchenko (Oleksandr Omelchenko Bloc)
| style="vertical-align:top;" |
| style="vertical-align:top;" |2.37%
| style="vertical-align:top;" | 18,82%
|-
| style="text-align:left;" |Oleh Tyahnybok (All-Ukrainian Union "Freedom")
| style="vertical-align:top;" |
| style="vertical-align:top;" |1.38%
| style="vertical-align:top;" |Did not run
|-
| style="text-align:left;" |Oleksandr Pabat (Kyiv Civil Activists)
| style="vertical-align:top;" |
| style="vertical-align:top;" |1.35%
| style="vertical-align:top;" |Did not run
|-
| style="text-align:left;" |Invalid ballot papers
| style="vertical-align:top;" |48,600
| style="vertical-align:top;" |
| style="vertical-align:top;" |
|-
|style="text-align:left;background-color:#E9E9E9"|Total (turnout 52.02%)
|width="100" style="text-align:right;background-color:#E9E9E9"|1,164,823
|width="30" style="text-align:right;background-color:#E9E9E9"|
|style="vertical-align:top;text-align:right;background-color:#E9E9E9"|
|-
| colspan=5 style="text-align:left;" |Source: UNIAN News Agency (English)
|}
<noinclude>

City Council election

|-
|style="background-color:#E9E9E9;text-align:left;vertical-align:top;" |Parties and blocs
!style="background-color:#E9E9E9"|Votes
! style="background-color:#E9E9E9;text-align:center;" |%
! style="background-color:#E9E9E9;text-align:center;" |Seats
! style="background-color:#E9E9E9;text-align:center;" |   (2006)
|-
| style="text-align:left;" |Leonid Chernovetskyi Bloc (Блок Леонід Черновецький)
Christian Liberal Party of Ukraine
Green Planet
Women of Ukraine
| style="vertical-align:top;" |350,700
| style="vertical-align:top;" |30.45%
| style="vertical-align:top;" |43
| style="vertical-align:top;" | 9%
|-
| style="text-align:left;" |Yulia Tymoshenko Bloc (Блок Юлії Тимошенко)
All-Ukrainian Union "Fatherland"
Ukrainian Social Democratic Party
Reforms and Order Party
| style="vertical-align:top;" |262,500
| style="vertical-align:top;" |22.79%
| style="vertical-align:top;" |32
| style="vertical-align:top;" | 19%
|-
| style="text-align:left;" |Vitaliy Klychko Bloc (Блок Віталія Кличко)
People's Movement of Ukraine
European capital
Ukrainian social-democrats
| style="vertical-align:top;" |
| style="vertical-align:top;" |10.61%
| style="vertical-align:top;" |15
| style="vertical-align:top;" |
|-
| style="text-align:left;" |Lytvyn Bloc (Блок Литвина)
People's Party
All-Ukrainian Patriotic Union
| style="vertical-align:top;" |
| style="vertical-align:top;" |8.17%
| style="vertical-align:top;" |11
| style="vertical-align:top;" |  4.54%
|-
| style="text-align:left;" |Kyiv Civil Activists (Громадський актив Києва)
Liberal Democratic Party of Ukraine
People's Party of depositors and social security
Party of Law Defense
| style="vertical-align:top;" |
| style="vertical-align:top;" |5.95%
| style="vertical-align:top;" |8
| style="vertical-align:top;" | 1,94%
|-
| style="text-align:left;" |Party of Regions (Партія регіонів)
| style="vertical-align:top;" |
| style="vertical-align:top;" |3.95%
| style="vertical-align:top;" |6
| style="vertical-align:top;" | 1,81%
|-
| style="text-align:left;" |Mykola Katerynchuk Bloc (Блок Миколи Катеринчука)
European Party of Ukraine
European platform
| style="vertical-align:top;" |
| style="vertical-align:top;" |3.47%
| style="vertical-align:top;" |5
| style="vertical-align:top;" |
|-
| style="text-align:left;" |Oleksandr Omelchenko Bloc (Блок Олександра Омельченка)
Social Democratic Union
Ukrainian Marine Party
| style="vertical-align:top;" |
| style="vertical-align:top;" |2,26%
| style="vertical-align:top;" |0
| style="vertical-align:top;" |Did not run
|-
| style="text-align:left;" |Communist Party of Ukraine (Комуністична партія України)
| style="vertical-align:top;" |
| style="vertical-align:top;" |2,24%
| style="vertical-align:top;" |0
| style="vertical-align:top;" | 0,5%
|-
| style="text-align:left;" |All-Ukrainian Union "Freedom" (Всеукраїнське об'єднання «Свобода»)
| style="vertical-align:top;" |
| style="vertical-align:top;" |2,08%
| style="vertical-align:top;" |0
| style="vertical-align:top;" | 1,71%
|-
| style="text-align:left;" |Our Ukraine–People's Self-Defense Bloc (Наша Україна)
Our Ukraine
People's Self-Defense
| style="vertical-align:top;" |23 202
| style="vertical-align:top;" |2%
| style="vertical-align:top;" |0
| style="vertical-align:top;" | 13%
|-
| style="text-align:left;" |Ukrainian People's Party (Українська народна партія)
| style="vertical-align:top;" |2 884
| style="vertical-align:top;" |0,25%
| style="vertical-align:top;" |0
| style="vertical-align:top;" | 1,3%
|-
| style="text-align:left;" |PORA (ПОРА)
| style="vertical-align:top;" |1,980
| style="vertical-align:top;" |0,17%
| style="vertical-align:top;" |0
| style="vertical-align:top;" | 13%
|-
| style="text-align:left;" |Invalid ballot papers
| style="vertical-align:top;" |184,159
| style="vertical-align:top;" |15,81%
| style="vertical-align:top;" |
| style="vertical-align:top;" |
|-
|style="text-align:left;background-color:#E9E9E9"|Total (turnout 52.02%)
|width="75" style="text-align:right;background-color:#E9E9E9"|1,164,823
|width="30" style="text-align:right;background-color:#E9E9E9"|100%
|width="30" style="text-align:right;background-color:#E9E9E9"|120
|style="vertical-align:top;text-align:right;background-color:#E9E9E9"|
|-
| colspan=5 style="text-align:left;" |Source: Ukrainian News
|-
| colspan=5 style="text-align:left;" |The Reforms and Order Party, Vitaliy Klychko Bloc and PORA contested the March 26, 2006 city council elections as one bloc.
|}<noinclude>

Faction chances since the elections
Severe changes occurred in the Kyiv City Council following 2008. As of September 2011 seven additional factions had been created (2 of them with only 2 members, 1 with 3 members). The faction of the winner of the election, the Leonid Chernovetskyi Bloc, disbanded itself on September 22, 2011. (all the deputies that were members of the faction at the time where then considered as independents); this made the faction of UDAR of Vitaliy Klychko the biggest faction with 12 seats (3 seats less them won) followed by the Party of Regions with 10 seats (4 seats more than won). Bloc Yulia Tymoshenko saw 22 deputies leaving the faction since the election.

In January 2013 the UDAR faction was 13 persons strong while the Party of Regions faction had fallen down to 8 people. This made the People's Party faction with 11 deputies the second biggest faction. The faction Democratic Party of Ukraine contained 10 deputies. Bloc Yulia Tymoshenko had lost 1 more deputy and stood at 9. Just as much as the factions Social Justice and Initiative. These last two and the faction Democratic Party of Ukraine where created in 2011. In June 2013 the People's Party faction contained 4 people. The other factions membership had stayed stable.

Following the 2008 election the following persons gave up there seat: Yulia Tymoshenko, Oleksandr Turchynov, Mykola Tomenko, Mykola Katerynchuk, Anatoliy Khostykoyev, Stepan Chernovetskyi (son of the Kyiv Mayor) and Tetiana Donets. The next person in the party list is appointed a city council deputy when their colleagues give up there seat.

Polls

According to a telephone poll conducted prior to the election by the Razumkov Centre, 25.2% of the respondents said they would support Vitaliy Klychko for the position of mayor, 24.9% support Mayor Leonid Chernovetskyi, 10% support the former city mayor Oleksandr Omelchenko, 6% support current Vice-Prime Minister Oleksandr Turchynov, and 5.4% said they support the Minister of Internal Affairs Yuriy Lutsenko.

A different poll conducted by the Center of Political and Marketing Studies Sotsis, showed that 22.8% of the respondents support the incumbent mayor, 22% support Vitaliy Klychko, 11.5% support Oleksandr Omelchenko, 6.3% support Verkhovna Rada Deputy Mykola Tomenko, and 5.7% support Yuriy Lutsenko.

Calls for new snap elections

On December 12, 2008 Prime Minister Yulia Tymoshenko announced at a news briefing that she was confident that early mayoral elections would be held again in Kyiv. On December 11, 2008 the Kyivenergo utility company began cutting the supply of hot water to about 5,000 homes in Kyiv  because of the Kyiv municipal administration's failure to compensate the company for the difference between the tariffs charged by Kyivenerho and the actual cost of its services, Tymoshenko accuses incumbent Mayor Leonid Chernovetskyi of using money from the municipal budget to finance his election campaign (and so there were insufficient funds to pay Kyivenerho).

On February 6, 2009 the Vitaliy Klychko Bloc stated it will apply to the Verkhovna Rada, the Cabinet of Ministers, the National Security and Defense Council and the Kyiv prosecutor's office with a request to take into consideration the unlawfulness of Mayor Leonid Chernovetskyi actions and to call early mayoral elections in the city.

Early January 2010 Parliament Speaker Volodymyr Lytvyn stated he started preparing a draft law to conduct an early mayoral election in Kyiv on May 30, 2010 as well as a local council election. He stated he "could not stand what was going on in Kyiv any longer" and that his own Lytvyn Bloc would will take part in the election. A resolution setting early Kyiv election for May 30, 2010 was registered in the Ukrainian parliament on January 18, 2010 but it was not included in the agenda yet. The resolution was cancelled on February 16, 2010.

On February 16, 2010 the Ukrainian parliament cancelled all Ukrainian local election dates original set for May 30, 2010. A new date was not set but Members of Parliament expected new local elections in the spring of 2011. Eventually these local elections did take place late 2010

After former Mayor Chernovetsky had tendered his resignation on 1 June 2012 a petition to the Ukrainian Parliament on holding an early mayoral election in the city was sent (the date of the early mayoral election is set by this parliament).

Although (in November 2011) it looked that the next Kyiv local election (including Mayoral elections) where set for 2012; in January 2013 the Ukrainian Parliament had set no date for these elections. Legally they had to take place in 2013. But in May 2013 the Constitutional Court of Ukraine set the date of the election to 25 October 2015.

Eventually elections for the post of Mayor and members of Kyiv City Council took place on 25 May 2014 as part of the 2014 Ukrainian local elections.

See also
 Legal status and local government of Kyiv
 2009 Ternopil Oblast local election
 2010 Ukrainian local elections

References

External links
 
 
 

2008 local election
Local elections in Ukraine
2008 elections in Ukraine
City council elections
Mayoral elections in Ukraine
Elections in Kyiv
2000s in Kyiv
May 2008 events in Ukraine